The Laetare Medal is an annual award given by the University of Notre Dame in recognition of outstanding service to the Catholic Church and society. The award is given to an American Catholic or group of Catholics "whose genius has ennobled the arts and sciences, illustrated the ideals of the church and enriched the heritage of humanity." First awarded in 1883, it is the oldest and most prestigious award for American Catholics.

Overview

The medal is an external award which can be given to a person from outside the University of Notre Dame. It is named the Laetare Medal because the recipient of the award is announced in celebration of Laetare Sunday, the fourth Sunday in Lent.  The Laetare Medal was conceived by University of Notre Dame professor James Edwards as an American version of the papal award the Golden Rose. It was approved of by the university's founder  Father Edward Sorin, C.S.C. The Golden Rose has existed since the 11th century, and was customarily awarded to a royal person on Laetare Sunday, although this was rarely done during the 20th century. The university adapted this tradition — awarding a gold medal, instead of a rose — to a distinguished American Catholic on Laetare Sunday. The medal has the Latin inscription  meaning "Truth is mighty, and it shall prevail." The medal is awarded during commencement at Notre Dame, during which the laureate delivers a remark.

A candidate for the award must be a practicing American Catholic who has made a distinctively Catholic contribution in his or her professional or intellectual life. A committee generally takes names of potential recipients from faculty and staff at the University of Notre Dame. They select two or three candidates from this group, which are voted on by the Officers of the University.

History 
John Gilmary Shea, a historian of the Catholic Church in the United States, was the first person to be awarded the Laetare Medal in 1883. The recipients of the Laetare Medal come from varied fields. Recipients include jazz musicians, Cardinals, philanthropists, ambassadors, authors, opera singers, Senators, doctors, generals, and a U.S. President. Both Catholic Presidents of the United States, Kennedy and Biden, are recipients of the award.

2009 Medal 
Harvard Law School professor and former United States Ambassador to the Holy See, Mary Ann Glendon, was chosen as the 2009 recipient but declined the award when the university, as part of its justification for naming Barack Obama as its commencement speaker and grant him an honorary degree, stated:"President Obama won’t be doing all the talking. Mary Ann Glendon, the former U.S. ambassador to the Vatican, will be speaking as the recipient of the Laetare Medal. ... We think having the president come to Notre Dame, see our graduates, meet our leaders, and hear a talk from Mary Ann Glendon is a good thing for the president and for the causes we care about." In light of Obama's strong pro-choice policies, Glendon considered Notre Dame's decision to be in violation of a 2004 pronouncement from the United States Conference of Catholic Bishops instructing Catholic institutions not to provide "honors, awards, or platforms" to "those who act in defiance of [Catholic] fundamental moral principles." She also believed that the University's statements had placed her in an untenable position; as she wrote in her letter declining the medal: "A commencement, however, is supposed to be a joyous day for the graduates and their families. It is not the right place, nor is a brief acceptance speech the right vehicle, for engagement with the very serious problems raised by Notre Dame’s decision—in disregard of the settled position of the U.S. bishops—to honor a prominent and uncompromising opponent of the Church’s position on issues involving fundamental principles of justice." Notre Dame ultimately selected 1984 Laetare recipient Judge John T. Noonan, Jr. to speak, choosing not to award the 2009 medal at all.

List of recipients

References

External links 
 

American awards
Awards established in 1883

Catholic ecclesiastical decorations
1883 establishments in the United States
Awards and prizes of the University of Notre Dame